Cole Bryson Tucker (born July 3, 1996) is an American professional baseball shortstop and outfielder in the Colorado Rockies organization. He made his Major League Baseball (MLB) debut with the Pittsburgh Pirates in 2019, and played with them through 2022.

Amateur career
Tucker attended Mountain Pointe High School in Phoenix, Arizona, where he played for the school's baseball team. He played for the United States national baseball team in the 2013 18U Baseball World Cup. He committed to play college baseball at the University of Arizona.

Professional career

Pittsburgh Pirates
The Pittsburgh Pirates selected Tucker in the first round, with the 24th overall selection, of the 2014 Major League Baseball draft. He signed on June 12, 2014 for a signing bonus worth $1,800,000, and spent 2014 with the Gulf Coast League Pirates, where he batted .267 with a .724 OPS. He had been committed to play college baseball for the Arizona Wildcats. Tucker spent 2015 with the West Virginia Power where he posted a .293 batting average along with 25 stolen bases and 13 doubles. Tucker returned to the Power in 2016, and was later promoted to the Bradenton Marauders, where he batted a combined .242 with two home runs and 27 runs batted in (RBIs) between both teams. In 2017, he began the season with Bradenton, and was promoted to the Altoona Curve in July. In 110 total games, Tucker posted a .275 batting average, six home runs, 50 RBIs, and 47 stolen bases in the 2017 campaign.

MLB.com ranked Tucker as Pittsburgh's fifth best prospect going into the 2018 season. The Pirates added him to their 40-man roster after the season. He opened the 2019 season with the Indianapolis Indians. On April 20, he was called up to the major league roster. He made his major league debut that afternoon versus the San Francisco Giants. During that game Tucker got his first major league hit in his third at bat, hitting a two-run home run off Derek Holland over the center field wall at PNC Park to give the Pirates a 3–1 lead. The home run became the game-winning hit after the game was called due to rain. In June, the Pirates optioned Tucker to Indianapolis.

In 2020, the Pirates played Tucker as an outfielder, as he slashed .211/.266/.361. The Pirates optioned Tucker to Indianapolis to start the 2021 season. He played in 13 games for the Pirates in May and July, and another 30 games after he was recalled in August. In 2021, he batted .222/.298/.342 in 43 games.

In 2022, Tucker appeared in 18 games for the Pirates, playing second base, shortstop and right field. He batted .175 before being optioned to Indianapolis on May 12. The Pirates designated Tucker for assignment on May 30.

Arizona Diamondbacks
On June 5, 2022, the Arizona Diamondbacks claimed Tucker off of waivers and optioned him to the Reno Aces of the Triple-A Pacific Coast League. On July 8, Tucker was outrighted by the Diamondbacks. He elected free agency after the 2022 season.

Colorado Rockies
On December 7, 2022, Tucker signed a minor league deal with the Colorado Rockies.

Personal life
Tucker grew up as a fan of the Arizona Diamondbacks. His father is African-American and his mother is European-American. His brother Carson was selected by the Cleveland Guardians in the first round of the 2020 Major League Baseball draft.

In February 2021, Tucker confirmed he was in a relationship with actress Vanessa Hudgens. The pair confirmed their engagement in February 2023.

References

External links

1996 births
Living people
African-American baseball players
Baseball players from Phoenix, Arizona
Major League Baseball shortstops
Pittsburgh Pirates players
Gulf Coast Pirates players
West Virginia Power players
Bradenton Marauders players
Altoona Curve players
Surprise Saguaros players
Indianapolis Indians players
21st-century African-American sportspeople